Loik may refer to:

People

Surnamed
 Ezio Loik (1919–1949), Italian soccer player
 Rein Loik (born 1950), Estonian politician
 Tõnu Loik (born 1875), Estonian politician

Given named
 Loïk, a Breton male given name
 Loïk Le Floch-Prigent (born 1943), French engineer

Places
 Kufstein-Langkampfen Airport (ICAO airport code LOIK), Tirol, Austria

See also

 
 Loic (disambiguation)